Kirsten Wenzel (later Strohbach, born 27 February 1961) is a rowing cox who represented East Germany.

Rowing career
Wenzel was born in 1961 in Leipzig. She started for SC DHfK Leipzig and won gold at the 1975 Spartakiad in the coxed quad scull. At the 1978 World Rowing Championships on Lake Karapiro in New Zealand, she became world champion with the coxed four team. In the same boat class but with different rowers, she won silver at the 1979 World Rowing Championships at Bled, Yugoslavia.

At the 1980 Summer Olympics in Moscow, Wenzel won gold with the coxed four. At the 1981 World Rowing Championships in Munich, she won silver with the coxed four. At the 1982 World Rowing Championships on the Rotsee in Switzerland she coxed the women's eight to bronze. She competed at the 1983 World Rowing Championships under her married name Strohbach and won a final bronze medal with the women's eight before she retired.

Private life
On 18 December 1982, Wenzel married Olympic swimmer Rainer Strohbach at the town hall of Pankow. She studied to become a teacher and taught at high schools in Berlin. She later divorced Strohbach.

References 

1961 births
Living people
Sportspeople from Leipzig
People from Bezirk Leipzig
East German female rowers
Coxswains (rowing)
Olympic rowers of East Germany
Rowers at the 1980 Summer Olympics
Olympic gold medalists for East Germany
Olympic medalists in rowing
World Rowing Championships medalists for East Germany
Medalists at the 1980 Summer Olympics
Recipients of the Patriotic Order of Merit in silver